Group A of the 1999 Fed Cup Europe/Africa Zone Group I was one of four pools in the Europe/Africa Zone Group I of the 1999 Fed Cup. Four teams competed in a round robin competition, with the top two teams advancing to the knockout stage.

South Africa vs. Denmark

Ukraine vs. Latvia

South Africa vs. Latvia

Ukraine vs. Denmark

South Africa vs. Ukraine

Latvia vs. Denmark

  failed to win any ties in the pool, and thus was relegated to Group II in 2000, where they placed first in their pool of six, and thus advanced back to Group I for 2001.

See also
Fed Cup structure

References

External links
 Fed Cup website

1999 Fed Cup Europe/Africa Zone